Jaime Daniel Melão Simões (born 11 June 1989 in Santarém), known simply as Jaime, is a Portuguese professional footballer who plays for S.C. Covilhã as a central defender.

References

External links

1989 births
Living people
People from Santarém, Portugal
Sportspeople from Santarém District
Portuguese footballers
Association football defenders
Primeira Liga players
Liga Portugal 2 players
S.C. Beira-Mar players
C.F. União players
Leixões S.C. players
S.C. Covilhã players
CFR Cluj players
Cypriot First Division players
Apollon Limassol FC players
Portuguese expatriate footballers
Expatriate footballers in Romania
Expatriate footballers in Cyprus
Portuguese expatriate sportspeople in Romania
Portuguese expatriate sportspeople in Cyprus